The 1927 Duluth Eskimos season was the Eskimos' final season in the NFL. Coached by Ernie Nevers, the Eskimos finished with a 1–8 record. The team scored 68 points and allowed 134.

Regular season

Schedule

Standings

Roster
Marion Ashmore T
Bunny Belden WB
Pots Clark WB
Fritz Cronin E
Walt Kiesling G
Chick Lang G
Jimmy Manion G
Jack McCarthy T
John "Blood" McNally HB
Bill McNellis WB
Russ Method WB
Clem Neacy E
Ernie Nevers FB
Cobb Rooney BB
Joe Rooney E
Bill Rooney C
Shanley T
Bill Stein C
Ray Suess G

References

Duluth Eskimos roster at football.about.com
Duluth Eskimos on Database Football
Duluth Eskimos on jt-sw.com

Duluth Eskimos seasons
Duluth Eskimos
American football in Minnesota
Duluth Eskimos